In mathematics, 1 − 2 + 3 − 4 + ··· is an infinite series whose terms are the successive positive integers, given alternating signs. Using sigma summation notation the sum of the first m terms of the series can be expressed as

The infinite series diverges, meaning that its sequence of partial sums, does not tend towards any finite limit. Nonetheless, in the mid-18th century, Leonhard Euler wrote what he admitted to be a paradoxical equation:

A rigorous explanation of this equation would not arrive until much later. Starting in 1890, Ernesto Cesàro, Émile Borel and others investigated well-defined methods to assign generalized sums to divergent series—including new interpretations of Euler's attempts. Cesàro summation is one of the few methods that do not sum , so the series is an example where a slightly stronger method, such as Abel summation, is required.

The series 1 − 2 + 3 − 4 + ... is closely related to Grandi's series . Euler treated these two as special cases of the more general sequence , where  and  respectively. This line of research extended his work on the Basel problem and leading towards the functional equations of what are now known as the Dirichlet eta function and the Riemann zeta function.

Divergence
The series' terms  do not approach 0; therefore  diverges by the term test. Divergence can also be shown directly from the definition: an infinite series converges if and only if the sequence of partial sums converges to limit, in which case that limit is the value of the infinite series.

The sequence of partial sums shows that the series does not converge to a particular number: for any proposed limit x, there exists a point beyond which the subsequent partial sums are all outside the interval ), so  diverges.

The partial sums include every integer exactly once—even 0 if one counts the empty partial sum—and thereby establishes the countability of the set  of integers.

Heuristics for summation

Stability and linearity
Since the terms  follow a simple pattern, the series  can be manipulated by shifting and term-by-term addition to yield a numerical value. If it can make sense to write  for some ordinary number s, the following manipulations argue for 

 So .

Although  does not have a sum in the usual sense, the equation  can be supported as the most natural answer if such a sum is to be defined. A generalized definition of the "sum" of a divergent series is called a summation method or summability method. There are many different methods and it is desirable that they share some properties of ordinary summation. Furthermore, since

such a method must also sum Grandi's series as

Cauchy product
For Cesàro, this equation was an application of a theorem he had published the previous year, which is the first theorem in the history of summable divergent series.

The Cauchy product of two infinite series is defined even when both of them are divergent. In the case where an = bn = (−1)n, the terms of the Cauchy product are given by the finite diagonal sums

The product series is then

Thus a summation method that respects the Cauchy product of two series — and assigns to the series  the sum 1/2 — will also assign to the series  the sum 1/4.

Cesàro's theorem is a subtle example. The series  is Cesàro-summable in the weakest sense, called  while  requires a stronger form of Cesàro's theorem, being  Since all forms of Cesàro's theorem are linear and stable, the values of the sums are as calculated above.

Specific methods

Cesàro and Hölder

To find the (C, 1) Cesàro sum of 1 − 2 + 3 − 4 + ..., if it exists, one needs to compute the arithmetic means of the partial sums of the series.
The partial sums are:

and the arithmetic means of these partial sums are:

This sequence of means does not converge, so 1 − 2 + 3 − 4 + ... is not Cesàro summable.

There are two well-known generalizations of Cesàro summation: the conceptually simpler of these is the sequence of (H, n) methods for natural numbers n. The (H, 1) sum is Cesàro summation, and higher methods repeat the computation of means.

The "H" stands for Otto Hölder, who first proved in 1882 what mathematicians now think of as the connection between Abel summation and (H, n) summation;  was his first example. The fact that  is the (H, 2) sum of  guarantees that it is the Abel sum as well; this will also be proved directly below.

The other commonly formulated generalization of Cesàro summation is the sequence of (C, n) methods. It has been proven that (C, n) summation and (H, n) summation always give the same results, but they have different historical backgrounds. In 1887, Cesàro came close to stating the definition of (C, n) summation, but he gave only a few examples. He formally defined the (C, n) methods in 1890 in order to state his theorem that the Cauchy product of a (C, n)-summable series and a (C, m)-summable series is (C, m + n + 1)-summable.

Abel summation

In a 1749 report, Leonhard Euler admits that the series diverges but prepares to sum it anyway:

Euler proposed a generalization of the word "sum" several times.

There are many ways to see that, at least for absolute values , Euler is right in that

One can take the Taylor expansion of the right-hand side, or apply the formal long division process for polynomials. Starting from the left-hand side, one can follow the general heuristics above and try multiplying by  twice or squaring the geometric series . Euler also seems to suggest differentiating the latter series term by term.

Since the function is defined for all , one can still take the limit as x approaches 1, and this is the definition of the Abel sum:

Euler and Borel

Euler applied another technique to the series: the Euler transform, one of his own inventions. To compute the Euler transform, one begins with the sequence of positive terms that makes up the alternating series—in this case  The first element of this sequence is labeled a0.

Next one needs the sequence of forward differences among ; this is just  The first element of this sequence is labeled Δa0. The Euler transform also depends on differences of differences, and higher iterations, but all the forward differences among  are 0.

The Euler summability also implies Borel summability, with the same summation value, as it does in general.

Separation of scales
To be precise, these principles lead them to define a broad family of "-summation methods", all of which sum the series to :

If (x) is a function whose first and second derivatives are continuous and integrable over (0, ∞), such that φ(0) = 1 and the limits of φ(x) and xφ(x) at +∞ are both 0, then 

This result generalizes Abel summation, which is recovered by letting (x) = exp(−x). The general statement can be proved by pairing up the terms in the series over m and converting the expression into a Riemann integral. For the latter step, the corresponding proof for  applies the mean value theorem, but here one needs the stronger Lagrange form of Taylor's theorem.

Generalization 

Another generalization of 1 − 2 + 3 − 4 + ... in a slightly different direction is the series  for other values of n. For positive integers n, these series have the following Abel sums:

where Bn are the Bernoulli numbers. For even n, this reduces to

which can be interpreted as stating that negative even values of the Riemann zeta function are zero. This sum became an object of particular ridicule by Niels Henrik Abel in 1826:

Cesàro's teacher, Eugène Charles Catalan, also disparaged divergent series. Finally, in his 1890 Sur la multiplication des séries, Cesàro took a modern approach starting from definitions.

The series are also studied for non-integer values of n; these make up the Dirichlet eta function. Euler had already become famous for finding the values of these functions at positive even integers (including the Basel problem), and he was attempting to find the values at the positive odd integers (including Apéry's constant) as well, a problem that remains elusive today. The eta function in particular is easier to deal with by Euler's methods because its Dirichlet series is Abel summable everywhere; the zeta function's Dirichlet series is much harder to sum where it diverges.

See also 

1 + 2 + 3 + 4 + ⋯
1 + 1 + 1 + 1 + ⋯
1 + 2 + 4 + 8 + ·...
1 − 2 + 4 − 8 + ⋯

References

Bibliography

 Originally published as 

 2nd Ed. published by Chelsea Pub. Co., 1991. . .

 Author also known as A. I. Markushevich and Alekseï Ivanovitch Markouchevitch. Additionally, .

Divergent series
Mathematical series
Mathematical paradoxes